Gabriel Oladele Olutola (born 4 April 1933) is a Nigerian-born author, pastor and motivational speaker. He is the former President of The Apostolic Church Nigeria and chairman, Lagos, Western and Northern Areas (LAWNA) after he was inducted simultaneously into both posts in 2011 and 2009 respectively. He also serves as the Chancellor of Samuel Adegboyega University.
Gabriel Olutola retired on 29 April 2017 and was replaced by Sampson Igwe as president of the Apostolic Church Nigeria and Segun Awojide as the LAWNA chairman. Olutola is among the Ijeshan leaders who helped to encourage Pentecostalism in Nigeria. He has been called one of the "notable servants of God" from Osun State. When asked what he would do after his retirement at 84, Olutola said he would continue to work for the Lord.

References

External links
Olutola profile at Samuel Adegboyega University. Archived from the original on 30 March 2016.

1933 births
Yoruba Christian clergy
Nigerian Christian clergy
Nigerian Pentecostal pastors
People from Ilesha
Living people